This is a graphical list of the popes of the Catholic Church.

While the term pope ('Father') is used in several churches to denote their high spiritual leaders, in English usage, this title generally refers to the supreme head of the Catholic Church and of the Holy See.  The title itself has been used officially by the head of the Church since the tenure of Pope Siricius.

There have been 266 popes, as listed by the Annuario Pontificio (Pontifical Yearbook) under the heading 'I Sommi Pontefici Romani' (The Supreme Pontiffs of Rome). Some sources quote a number of 267, with the inclusion of Stephen II, who died four days after his election but before his episcopal consecration. However, only 264 (or 265) men have occupied the chair of Saint Peter, as Benedict IX held the office thrice on separate occasions in the mid–11th century.

The pope bears the titles
Bishop of Rome, Vicar of Jesus Christ, Successor of the Prince of the Apostles, Supreme Pontiff of the Universal Church, Primate of Italy, Archbishop and Metropolitan of the Roman Province, Sovereign of the Vatican City State, Servant of the Servants of God
and is officially styled 'His Holiness'.

Since the Lateran Treaty of 1929, the pope's temporal title has been Sovereign of the Vatican City State.

Graphical depictions of papal reigns 
Antipopes are shown in red.

Until 250

251–514

514–752

752–1003

1003–1254

1254–1503

1503–1758

since 1758

See also 
 Liber Pontificalis
 List of antipopes
 List of canonised and beatified popes
 List of sexually active popes
 Papal name
 Prophecy of the Popes

References
John N. D. Kelly, The Oxford Dictionary of Popes. Oxford University Press, 1986.
, . , 2000.
, . , 2002.

External links
Catholic Encyclopedia

Popes
Popes
Popes